Kaiser San Jose Medical Center, also known as Kaiser Santa Teresa, is a Kaiser Permanente hospital in San Jose, California, located in the Santa Teresa district of South San Jose. Kaiser San Jose has been ranked within the top 50 best hospitals in the United States by Healthgrades in 2019, 2020, and 2021.

History

Kaiser opened its facilities in Santa Teresa in 1970, originally as a medical offices site.

In 1982, it opened its Gilroy Medical Offices site, serving the South Valley region of the Santa Clara Valley.

In 2010, Kaiser San Jose was included in the Leapfrog Group's ranking of top hospitals. 

Owing to its location within the high-tech influence of Silicon Valley, Kaiser San Jose's medical training program has often included innovative practices and equipment, such as robotic patients for medical training purposes.

Since 2016, Kaiser San Jose has hosted a farmers market on its campus, as part of its initiative to promote healthier eating habits.

COVID-19 pandemic 
During the COVID-19 pandemic, Kaiser San Jose was the center of a large coronavirus breakout on Christmas Day 2020, which resulted in more than 100 positive cases and 1 staff death, one of the largest outbreaks in the Bay Area.

The Santa Clara County Health Department fined the hospital $85,000 for delays in reporting the outbreak.

Facilities
Kaiser San Jose is located in the Santa Teresa district of South San Jose. It is nearby to the West Valley Freeway (CA-85) and the Cottle station of the VTA light rail.

Kaiser San Jose Medical Center also operates a medical offices site in Gilroy, California, in the South Valley region of Silicon Valley.

References

External links

Kaiser Permanente hospitals
Buildings and structures in San Jose, California
Hospitals in the San Francisco Bay Area